Marías District is one of nine districts of the province Dos de Mayo in Peru.

Geography 
Some of the highest mountains of the district are listed below:

Ethnic groups 
The people in the district are mainly indigenous citizens of Quechua descent. Quechua  is the language which the majority of the population (80.45%) learnt to speak in childhood, 19.28% of the residents started speaking using the Spanish language (2007 Peru Census).

See also 
 Qiwllaqucha

References